Zoe Lee Bettison is an Australian politician representing the South Australian House of Assembly seat of Ramsay for the South Australian Branch of the Australian Labor Party since the 2012 Ramsay by-election.

Bettison has served as the Minister for Tourism and Minister for Multicultural Affairs in the Malinauskas ministry since March 2022. She has previously served in other ministerial roles in the Weatherill ministry between 2014 and 2018.

Background
Bettison had previously held positions with Great Southern Rail, and within the Australian Labor Party. Bettison is linked with the Shop, Distributive and Allied Employees Association (SDA).

Political career
Bettison is aligned with Labor's Right faction.

The 2012 Ramsay by-election was held after the resignation of Labor incumbent and former Premier Mike Rann. Bettison easily retained the seat. She was re-elected with an increased margin at the 2014 election. In March 2014 Bettison became Minister for Communities and Social Inclusion, Minister for Social Housing, Minister for Multicultural Affairs, Minister for Ageing, Minister for Youth, Minister for Veterans Affairs and Minister for Volunteers in the Weatherill Labor cabinet. Between 2014 and the 2018 state election Bettison has also served as the minister with responsibility for a range of portfolios, including communities and social inclusion, social housing, the status of women, ageing, multicultural affairs, youth, volunteers.

After Labor won the 2022 election, Bettison was appointed as Minister for Tourism and Minister for Cultural Affairs in the Malinauskas ministry.

On 2 September 2022, as Minister for Multicultural Affairs, Bettison said that there would be a Parliamentary inquiry into "neo-Nazi symbols, the activities of extremist groups, discrimination faced by targeted groups and the prohibition on symbols in other states". This was partly prompted by the activities of a group of neo-Nazis who had posted photographs of themselves giving fascist salutes outside the Adelaide Holocaust Museum, and concerns had been raised about the activities of groups such as the National Socialist Network in South Australia.

References

External links

Parliamentary Profile: SA Labor website

Members of the South Australian House of Assembly
Living people
21st-century Australian politicians
Women members of the South Australian House of Assembly
Year of birth missing (living people)
21st-century Australian women politicians